The California Horse of the Year is an American horse racing honor awarded annually since 1973 by the California Thoroughbred Breeders Association (CTBA) to a Thoroughbred racehorse bred in the state of California.

Winners
2021 - Lieutenant Dan
2020 - Mucho Unusual
2019 - Spiced Perfection
2018 - Spiced Perfection
2017 - Sircat Sally
 2016 - California Chrome
 2015 - Gimme Da Lute
 2014 - California Chrome
 2013-  Points Offthebench
 2012-  Acclamation
 2011 - Acclamation
 2010-  Evening Jewel
 2009 - California Flag & Dancing in Silks (tie)
 2008 - Bob Black Jack
 2007 - Nashoba's Key
 2006 - Lava Man
 2005 - Lava Man
 2004 - Moscow Burning
 2003 - Joey Franco
 2002 - Continental Red
 2001 - Tiznow
 2000 - Tiznow
 1999 - Budroyale 
 1998 - Free House
 1997 - Free House
 1996 - Cavonnier
 1995 - Cat's Cradle
 1994 - Soviet Problem
 1993 - Bertrando
 1992 - Best Pal
 1991 - Best Pal
 1990 - Best Pal
 1989 - Brown Bess
 1988 - King Glorious
 1987 - Snow Chief
 1986 - Snow Chief
 1985 - Snow Chief
 1984 - Silveyville
 1983 - Fali Time
 1982 - Prince Spellbound
 1981 - Eleven Stitches
 1980 - Jaklin Klugman
 1979 - Golden Act
 1978 - Flying Paster
 1977 - Crystal Water
 1976 - Crystal Water
 1975 - Ancient Title
 1974 - Ancient Title
 1973 - Windy's Daughter

References

 California Horse of the Year at the CTBA
 CTBA list of California-bred Champions

Horse racing awards